Molde International Jazz Festival (MIJF) or Moldejazz (established 1961 in Molde) takes place annually in July, and is known as one of the oldest jazz festivals in Europe. It was initiated by the local Storyville Jazz Club.  Since 1964 it has received government support, and the government Buddy Award was for several years awarded at this festival. To the extent Molde festival operates with records, is probably the bassist Bjørn Kjellemyr holder of "Most festivals in a row" musicians record. In 2015 he visits Moldejazz for the 17th time in row as performer. Two club gigs with Dag Arnesen's band is on the program for the versatile bassist. Guttorm Guttormsen (1974), Jon Balke (1975), Karin Krog (1978), Knut Riisnæs (1984), Terje Rypdal (1985, 1986, 1988) and Jon Eberson (1987, 1989) are among the artists he has visited Moldejazz through the years.

Celebrity jazz artists

Artist in residence

2000: Chick Corea
2001: Pat Metheny
2002: Paal Nilssen-Love
2003: Michael Brecker
2004: Håvard Wiik
2005: Arild Andersen
2006: Joshua Redman 
2007: Terje Rypdal
2008: Marilyn Mazur
2009: Arve Henriksen
2010: Nils Petter Molvær
2011: Dave Holland
2012: Jon Balke
2013: Jason Moran
2014: Sidsel Endresen
2015: Mats Gustafsson
2016: Ola Kvernberg
2017: Vijay Iyer
2018: Maria Schneider
2019: Gard Nilssen

Frequently visiting artists

Asmund Bjørken (1961/62,65–68/70/74/79/80/93)
Jan Garbarek (1964–66/68/69/71/75–78/80/82/85/88/90/94)
Karin Krog (1963/68/70/71/78/84/87/97, 2008)
Niels-Henning Ørsted Pedersen (1964–68/70–74/81/84/85/88–90/93, 2000/02)
John Scofield (1984–87/89/90/92/95/97/99, 2006)
Bjørn Kjellemyr (1974–)

The daily parade has for several years been led by New Orleans-musician Lionel Batiste.

Recordings and compositions
Concerts have been broadcast to the EBU, the first was Guttorm Guttormsen's quintet (1974),
later Jan Gunnar Hoff Group (1996).  The NRK transmit daily.  
The composition  Break of day in Molde  (1969) was composed by Johs. Bergh and Karin Krog, based on Carla Bley's Ida Lupino. 
Live recordings include

1973: Sam Rivers Live Trio Sessions including Suite for Molde and Arild Andersen
1976: Carl Magnus Neumann's Live at Moldejazz 1976
1978: Muddy Waters, Three concerts
1980: Bill Evans in 1980 (The Oslo Concerts
1981: Arild Andersen and Bill Frisells A Molde concert
1984: Miles Davis Band Fra Idrettens Hus (DVD)
1989: Hermeto Pascoal e Grupo
1991: Rick Danko, Jonas Fjeld and Eric Andersen (One more shot, 1991/2000)
1994: Farmers Market (Speed Balkan boogie, 1994)
2000: Merzbow/Jazzkammer, Live at Molde
2002/03: Michael Brecker (with Farmers Market 2002, directions in music 03)
2004: Paal Nilssen-Love, Twentyseven years later (2002), Pipes and Bones
2005: Trondheim Jazz Orchestra and Chick Corea, Live in Molde
2005: Matthew Bourne, The Molde Concert (2005)
2007: Peter Brötzmann, Chicago tentet at Molde 2007
2008: Chick Corea and Gary Burton, The New Crystal Silence
2010: Ytre Suløens Jassensemble, Live at Moldejazz

Pop artists
Concerts co-occurring with the jazz festival include
blues-, rock- and pop-musicians such as

1977: Muddy Waters
1986: James Brown 
1989: Blues Brothers
1991: Motorpsycho
1996: Bob Dylan
1996: Van Morrison
1997: Eric Clapton 
1998: Gipsy Kings
1999: Jeff Healey and Ray Charles
2000: Buena Vista Social Club
2001: B.B. King
2002: Paul Simon, Santana and Joe Cocker
2003: Ibrahim Ferrer
2004: Stevie Wonder 
2005: Lauryn Hill
2006: Sting
2007: Steely Dan and Elvis Costello
2008: Patti Smith and Mary J. Blige
2009: Leonard Cohen, Jamie Cullum and Raphael Saadiq
2010: Jeff Beck, Karpe Diem and Missy Elliott
2011: Sinéad O'Connor
2012: Norah Jones and Janelle Monáe 
2013: Bryan Ferry
2015: Robert Plant 
2017: Aurora and Jarle Bernhoft 
2018: Van Morrison and Motorpsycho 
2019: Madrugada and Blood, Sweat & Tears

Molderosen 
Molderosen is an award established in 1967 awarded annually at Moldejazz to a person that during the festival helped to put Molde on the map.

Literature
Arild Steen,  Molde jazz (Gyldendal, 1972)
Terje Mosnes, Jazz i Molde two volumes (1981, 1991).

References

External links

nrk.no offers audio and video coverage

Music festivals established in 1961
1961 establishments in Norway
Jazz festivals in Norway
Molde
Culture in Møre og Romsdal
Annual events in Norway
Summer events in Norway